Phallusia is a genus of tunicates of the family ascidians, which includes the following species:

Phallusia aperta (Sluiter, 1904)
Phallusia arabica Savigny, 1816
Phallusia barbarica Kott, 1985
Phallusia colleta (C. Monniot & F. Monniot, 1970)
Phallusia depressiuscula (Heller, 1878)
Phallusia fragilis Bonnet & Rocha, 2011
Phallusia fumigata (Grube, 1864)
Phallusia ingeria Traustedt, 1883
Phallusia julinea Sluiter, 1915
Phallusia koreana Traustedt, 1885
Phallusia kottae (Monniot & Monniot, 1996)
Phallusia mammillata (Cuvier, 1815)
Phallusia millari Kott, 1985
Phallusia nigra Savigny, 1816
Phallusia obesa (Herdman, 1880)
Phallusia philippinensis Millar, 1975
Phallusia polytrema (Herdman, 1906)
Phallusia recifensis (Millar, 1977)
Phallusia suensonii Traustedt, 1885

Gallery

References

Enterogona
Tunicate genera
Taxa named by Marie Jules César Savigny